The Monmore Puppy Derby also known as the Premier Greyhound Racing Puppy Derby for sponsorship purposes, is a greyhound competition held at Monmore Green Stadium. It was inaugurated in 1943 and was has also been known as the Midland Puppy Championship, the Midland Puppy Derby and the Ladbrokes Puppy Derby.

In 2022, the event was sponsored by Premier Greyhound Racing and £20,000 was awarded to the winner, which was double the amount that the traditional and long running competition The Puppy Derby offered.

Past winners

Venues 
1943–present (Monmore 480m)
1963–1963 (Willenhall)
1978–1983 (not held)

Sponsors
1994–1994 (Carlsberg Group)
2007–2021 (Ladbrokes)
2022-2023 (Premier Greyhound Racibng)

References

Greyhound racing competitions in the United Kingdom
Sport in Wolverhampton
Recurring sporting events established in 1943